is a Japanese singer-songwriter. Making his professional debut in 1993, Saito's popularity exploded in 2007 after 15 years in the music industry. In 2013, Saito became the first Japanese musician to have a signature model acoustic guitar with Gibson. As of 2020, he had six signature models with them and one with Epiphone.

Early life
Saito was born to parents who worked for a toy maker in Mibu, Tochigi. He has two sisters, one older and one younger. He started playing with a guitar in elementary school. Due to his elder sister's influence, in junior high and high school he became addicted to hard rock acts like the Michael Schenker Group, Kiss, Aerosmith, Van Halen and AC/DC. Around the same time, he was in a Loudness cover band. Saito graduated from Sakushin Gakuin high school. He dropped out of Yamanashi Gakuin University.

Career

1992–2012: Early career and later popularity
In 1992, Saito appeared on the TBS audition TV show Seiki Roku Wagayateki Denshi Miyake Yūji no Tenka Gomen!. He made his professional debut in August 1993 with the single "Boku no Mita Beatles wa TV no Naka" on BMG's Funhouse record label, and had his first one-man concert at Nissin Power Station on September 17. His first album, Aoi Sora no Shita..., followed on September 26, 1993. Saito's 1994 song "Aruite Kaerō" was used in the Fuji TV children's show Hirake! Ponkikki. His fourth album Fire Dog was released in February 1996. 15 years later, its song "Sora ni Hoshi ga Kirei" was chosen to be the theme of the 2009 film Kichijōji no Asahina-kun. Saito's first release to reach the top-ten on the Oricon music charts was his 1997 album Dilemma. His seventh album, March 2000's Cold Tube, was his first after switching record labels to Victor's Speedstar. In 2006, Saito and other musicians born in 1966 performed under the name Roots66 for an event put together by FM802.

After 15 years in the music business, Saito's popularity exploded between 2007 and 2008. In 2007, his songs "Wedding Song" and "Ai ni Kite" were hits after being featured in popular TV commercials. The same thing happened with "Ya Mujō" and "Otsukare-sama no Kuni" the following year, with the former going on to win an Excellent Work Award at the 50th Japan Record Awards. Saito's March 2007 album Kurenai-ban is officially labelled a "concept album" because the songs are all about love. With few exceptions, it is mainly composed of covers of songs by other artists. His 12th studio album I Love Me was released in October 2007. The August 2008 compilation Utautai 15 Singles Best 1993–2007 reached fourth place on the Oricon Albums Chart. Music news websites reported that another reason for the late success was that celebrities, including some of which grew up listening to his music, were publicly praising Saito, such as Ryo Nishikido, Riko Narumi, Kazutoshi Sakurai and Puffy.

Saito covered "Hells Bells" for the March 2008 AC/DC tribute album Thunder Tracks. He has made guest appearances with the rock band Lazy since 2008. He is a featured artist on the 2009 version of their 1980 song "Kanjite Knight" for the TV show Shin Mazinger Shōgeki! Z Hen!. Saito composed the music to "Niji ga Kieru Made", which Kyōko Koizumi sang as the theme of the 2009 film Honokaa Boy. His song "Don't Worry Be Happy" was a theme song of the variety show Mezanyu~, while "Ai no Akari" was the theme of the TV drama Limit -Keiji no Genba 2-. At Nishikido's request, Saito wrote the title track for his band Kanjani Eight's album Puzzle. He also wrote "Hare Onna" for Puffy's 2009 album Bring It!. Saito's album Tsuki ga Noboreba was released in September 2009, and includes "Phoenix" which he wrote in memoriam Kiyoshiro Imawano. For Fumiya Fujii's 2009 album F's Cinema, Saito wrote the song "Tsumihoroboshi".

Saito provided vocals to "Kimi to Boku 2010" for Tokyo Ska Paradise Orchestra's 2010 album World Ska Symphony. His own album, Are You Ready?, was released in October 2010 and won an Excellent Work Award at the 52nd Japan Record Awards. His music video for "Zutto Suki Datta", which recreated The Beatles' rooftop concert, later won Best Male Video at the 2011 Space Shower Music Video Awards.

Saito covered "Uguisu" for the 2011 Reichi Nakaido tribute album OK!!! C'mon Chabo!!!, and recorded a duet version of his own 1994 song "Aruite Kaerō" in French with Clémentine for her album Zoku Animentine. In June 2011, Saito formed the rock duo Mannish Boys with drummer Tatsuya Nakamura. They had their first concert at the Join Alive music festival on July 24, and their second at the Fuji Rock Festival on July 31. Saito's October 2011 album 45 Stones includes two songs written with Nakamura and his own version of "Niji ga Kieru Made". It reached number two on the Oricon, sold 28,000 copies in its first week, and was supported by a 42-date national tour. Saito wrote and performed "Yasashiku Naritai" to be the ending theme of the 2011 TV drama Kaseifu no Mita. It has sold over 2.5 million physical and digital copies, making it one of the best-selling singles in Japan. That year he also wrote the number one single "Boku no Hanbun" for the boy band SMAP.

Saito is a featured guest on "Naraku to Sōshitsu Kibō to Yume" from Number the.'s January 2012 album Night Songs, and covered "Angel" for the Imawano tribute album King of Songwriter ~Songs of Kiyoshiro Covers~. He wrote his May 2012 single "Gekkō" to be the theme of the TV drama Kazoku no Uta, and composed the music to "(500) Nichi no Magic" for Halcali's album Halcali no Okawari. Saito recorded his own version of "Hare Onna" for the July Puffy tribute album Puffy Covers. Mannish Boys released their first album, Ma! Ma! Ma! Mannish Boys!!!, on September 19, 2012. That same day Saito released the special album One Night Acoustic Recording Session at NHK CR-509 Studio, which as the title suggests is a studio live album recorded in a single night. Under the pseudonym , he is a featured guest on "Himegimi Shake!" from Rekishi's December album Rekimi. "Yasashiku Naritai" won an Excellent Work Award at the 54th Japan Record Awards, and Saito performed it at the 63rd NHK Kōhaku Uta Gassen at the end of the year.

2013–present: Continued success
Saito marked his 20th anniversary as a professional musician in 2013 and held his first arena tour to 35,000 people. He wrote "One More Time" to be the theme of the anime film Detective Conan: Private Eye in the Distant Sea, and "Kagerō" for the live-action film adaptation of Kiyoku Yawaku. He released two studio albums that year, Saito and Kazuyoshi. The former collects the singles he released since 45 Stones and his own versions of two songs he wrote for other artists, "Puzzle" and "Tsumihoroboshi", while the latter album is all new material. They reached numbers 2 and 3 on the Oricon, respectively. The albums' tour featured 62 performances in 55 cities and mobilized 140,000 people. Throughout the year, Saito also collaborated with Takashi Hamazaki on "Detarame" for his January 2013 album Gachi × Dachi, with Ren Takada on "Machi Bōke" for his June album Ensemble, and with Kaela Kimura on a cover of "Crazy Little Thing Called Love" for her October album Rock.

Mannish Boys released their second album, Mu? Mu? Mu? Mannish Boys!!!, in September 2014 and went on their first one-man tour. Saito wrote, produced and performed all the instruments on "Player" for Mari Natsuki to sing as the ending theme of the anime Ronja, the Robber's Daughter. He also collaborated with Shinobu Otake on a cover of Miyuki Nakajima's "Kitsune Kari no Uta" for Otake's December 2014 album Utagokoro Koigokoro.

Saito wrote "Jun Ai" for Masayuki Suzuki to be included on his March 2015 compilation All Time Best ~Martini Dictionary~. He also composed, produced, co-wrote and is featured on Kavka Shishido's 2015 song "Don't Be Love". Saito covered "Shiroi Parasol" by Seiko Matsuda for the Takashi Matsumoto tribute album Kazemachi de Aimashō. He is a featured musician on "(Just Like) Starting Over" and "Mō Ichido Sekai o Kaeru no Sa (Album Ver.)" from Theatre Brook's July 2015 album Love Changes the World. Saito's October 2015 album Kaze no Hate Made was recorded in Los Angeles, features musicians such as Darryl Jones, Money Mark and Charley Drayton, and reached number two on the charts. He held a 62-date national tour from November 2015 to May 2016.

Saito appears on two songs from Ohashi Trio's February 2016 album 10 (Ten), providing guitar on "Ai de Kimi wa Kirei ni Naru" and featured vocals on "Koisuru Rider". He wrote and is featured on "Don't Cry Baby" from Toko Furuuchi's March 2016 album Toko Furuuchi with 10 Legends. After 10 years, Roots66 was revived with many more participating musicians for three performances in March and April 2016. Saito wrote "Muddy Water" to be the theme of the TV drama Fukigen'na Kajitsu, and "Ikisaki wa Mirai" to be the theme of the film Samurai Hustle Returns. In October 2016, Mannish Boys released their third album Uruwashi no Furasuka.

Saito wrote, co-composed and features on "Zatchunōza" for Special Others' March 2017 album Special Others II. His 1997 song "Utautai no Ballad" was chosen to be the theme song of the May 2017 anime film Lu over the Wall. He wrote "Iden" for the TV drama Gekokujō Juken and "I'm a Dreamer" for the drama Izakaya Fuji, which is about an actual izakaya that he knew. As Roots66, Saito and 26 other musicians recorded the song "Let's Go! Muttsugo! ~Rokushoku no Niji~" to be an ending theme of Mr. Osomatsu in October. Saito covered "Tasogare My Love" for the November 2017 Yū Aku tribute album Chikyū no Otoko ni Akita Tokoro yo ~Aku Yū Respect Album.

Saito's March 2018 album Toys Blood Music, which he recorded almost entirely by himself, became his first number one record. Its national tour featured 47 performances in 41 cities. Saito covered Elephant Kashimashi's "Kakedasu Otoko" for the Elephant Kashimashi Cover Album 3 ~A Tribute to The Elephant Kashimashi~. To celebrate his 25th anniversary, he held a nine-date anniversary tour and released the compilation album Utautai 25 Singles Best 2008–2017 in July. On July 11, 2018, Saito, Yohito Teraoka (Jun Sky Walkers), Tamio Okuda, Takashi Hamazaki (Flying Kids), Yo-King (Magokoro Brothers) and Tortoise Matsumoto announced the formation of a supergroup called the Curling Sitones. They formed for a concert on September 23, 2018 at Zepp Tokyo celebrating Teraoka's 25th anniversary as a musician.

Saito wrote the lyrics to and is featured on "Mystery Train" and "Hana Ichi Monme" from Yoshitaka Minami's September 2018 album Dear My Generation. On November 8, Saito organized a concert at Zepp Diver City featuring numerous other musicians such as his Curling Sitones bandmates, Chara, Yōko Oginome, Yasuyuki Okamura and Sakura Fujiwara where the proceeds went to reconstruction from the 2018 Japan floods. Saito wrote "Color" for the 2018 film Kazokuiro -Railways Watashi-tachi no Shuppatsu-.

Mannish Boys released an EP titled Naked in January 2019. Saito wrote "Are" to be the theme of the TV drama Your Home is My Business! 2nd Attack, and co-composed "Beautiful Dreams" for Kemuri vocalist Fumio Ito's March 2019 album Friendship. He also played guitar on "Okusoko no Uta" from Takehara Pistol's September album It's My Life. Using lyrics that Momoko Sakura wrote about him before she died, Saito composed "Itsumo no Fūkei" to be an ending theme of the anime adaptation of Sakura's Chibi Maruko-chan. Saito wrote nine songs for the musical Rockabilly Jack by Yukinojo Mori. The Curling Sitones' first album Hyojo no Rogue was release in November 2019. Their song "Suberi Shirazu Shirazu" was named the theme song of the 2020 Japan Curling Championships, the first ever in the competition's history.

Saito's 20th studio album 202020 was released in January 2020. That year, he wrote "Junpu" to be the theme song of Junji Takada's TV show Jun Sanpo. Saito's next album, 55 Stones, was released in March 2021.

Personal life
Saito married a woman of the same age, who works as a writer, in 1995. After 15 years of marriage, they had their first child, a boy, on June 3, 2010.

Saito has collaborated several times with author Kōtarō Isaka. Isaka quit his company job and focused on writing after hearing Saito's 1997 song "Kōfuku na Chōshoku Taikutsu na Yūshoku". The author wrote the 2007 short story "Eine Kleine" after receiving a request for song lyrics from Saito, and a character in it is named after the musician. Saito wrote the song "Very Very Strong -Eine Kleine-" based on the story, and Isaka then wrote a story titled "Light Heavy" in response that was included with the limited edition of the single. When Eine Kleine Nachtmusik, the Isaka collection that includes the two previously mentioned stories and others, was adapted into a film in 2019, Saito provided its music. Saito previously provided music to the film adaptations of Isaka's Fish Story, Golden Slumber and Potechi.

Discography

Studio albums

Mini-albums

Singles

Compilation albums

Live albums

Other albums

Videography

References

External links
 Official website
 Mannish Boys Official website
 Curling Sitones Official website

1966 births
Living people
20th-century Japanese male singers
21st-century Japanese male singers
20th-century Japanese guitarists
21st-century Japanese guitarists
Japanese male singer-songwriters
Japanese male rock singers
Japanese rock guitarists
Japanese multi-instrumentalists
Musicians from Tochigi Prefecture
Folk rock musicians